Yuriy Hayduk, (Ukrainian: Юрій Гайдук; born 12 July 1985 in Lviv) is a Ukrainian luger who has competed since 2003. Competing in two Winter Olympics, he earned his best finish of 14th in the men's doubles event at Turin in 2006.

Hayduk best finish at the FIL World Luge Championships in the men's double event was 14th twice (2008, 2009). His best finish at the FIL European Luge Championships was ninth in the men's doubles event at Sigulda in 2010.

References
 
 
 2006 luge men's doubles results

External links
 

1985 births
Living people
Ukrainian male lugers
Olympic lugers of Ukraine
Lugers at the 2006 Winter Olympics
Lugers at the 2010 Winter Olympics
Sportspeople from Lviv